Ralph George Macchio Jr. (born November 4, 1961) is an American actor. He is best known for playing Daniel LaRusso in three Karate Kid films and in Cobra Kai, a sequel television series. He also played Johnny Cade in The Outsiders, Jeremy Andretti in Eight Is Enough, Bill Gambini in My Cousin Vinny, Eugene Martone in Crossroads, and Archie Rodriguez in Ugly Betty, and had a recurring role as Officer Haddix in The Deuce.

Early life
Macchio was born in Huntington, New York. He is the son of Rosalie (née DeSantis) and Ralph George Macchio Sr., who owned a few laundromats and a wastewater disposal company. Ralph has a younger brother Steven. His father is of half Italian and half Greek descent, and his mother is of Italian ancestry. In a 1980 screen test, Macchio said his family was from Naples. In 1979, Macchio graduated from Half Hollow Hills Central School District in New York.

Macchio began tap dancing lessons at the age of three and was discovered by a talent agent when he was 16 years old.

Career

Early roles
Macchio was cast as Jeremy Andretti for two seasons in the television series Eight Is Enough. He next won the role of Johnny Cade in the 1983 film The Outsiders.

Karate Kid films
His work on The Outsiders helped him to win the role of Daniel LaRusso in the blockbuster 1984 film The Karate Kid. He continued to portray the character in two of its sequels, The Karate Kid Part II (1986) and The Karate Kid Part III (1989). In The Karate Kid, Macchio portrayed a "high school weakling turned bullybuster" who learns karate from his friend and mentor, Mr. Miyagi (portrayed by Pat Morita). Macchio's work in the Karate Kid series made him "stratospherically famous".

Later roles
Macchio appeared in the 1986 film Crossroads, portraying music student Eugene Martone. Also in 1986, Macchio starred in Cuba and His Teddy Bear on Broadway, alongside Robert DeNiro. In 1992, he starred opposite Joe Pesci and Marisa Tomei in the hit comedy My Cousin Vinny, playing Billy Gambini, who was wrongfully accused of murder while passing through a small Alabama town. In 1996, Macchio performed the lead role of J. Pierrepont Finch in the U.S. tour revival of the 1962 Tony Award-winning musical How to Succeed in Business Without Really Trying, and received positive reviews. Referring to his performance as a chorister in a high school production of the same musical, Macchio said, "I was known as the 'Dancing Kid,' not that I was all that great. But I had been dancing since the age of three, taking lessons at the June Claire School of Dance in Babylon, Long Island."

In 2005, Macchio played himself in the HBO series Entourage. Beginning in October 2008, he appeared in several episodes of the ABC Network television series Ugly Betty as Archie Rodriguez, a local politician who is Hilda's love interest. As of November 2008, Macchio was ranked No. 80 among VH1's 100 Greatest Teen Stars.

On September 20, 2010, Macchio played the adult Carl Morelli in a staged reading of the Charles Messina play A Room of My Own presented by the Bleecker Street Theater Company. In February 2011, it was announced that Macchio would compete on ABC's Dancing with the Stars. He was eliminated during the semi-finals, placing fourth in the overall competition. Macchio appeared in Canadian band Danko Jones' music videos for "Had Enough" and "I Think Bad Thoughts".

In April 2012, Macchio was cast in the film Hitchcock, based on the non-fiction book Alfred Hitchcock and the Making of Psycho. Macchio portrayed Psycho screenwriter Joseph Stefano.

Post-Karate Kid and Cobra Kai
Macchio appeared in the 2007 music video for the song "Sweep the Leg" by No More Kings as a caricature of himself and Daniel from The Karate Kid.

In June 2010, Macchio appeared in Funny or Die's online short, "Wax On, F*ck Off", in which his loved ones stage an intervention to turn the former child star from a well-adjusted family man into an addict besieged with tabloid scandal in order to help his career, with frequent references to The Karate Kid. A recurring joke in the sketch is that Macchio is confused for an adolescent. The short was lauded by TV Guide'''s Bruce Fretts, who referred to the video as "sidesplitting" and "comic gold".

In 2013, he appeared in How I Met Your Mother. One of the main characters, Barney Stinson, asserts that Macchio's character, Daniel LaRusso, in The Karate Kid is not the real karate kid; instead, it's Johnny Lawrence, Daniel's nemesis in the film. 

At a celebration of the 30th anniversary of The Karate Kid at the Japanese American National Museum in 2014, Macchio said that the yellow 1947 Ford convertible his character Daniel receives from Miyagi in the first film was sitting in his garage.

Beginning in 2018, Macchio reprised his role as Daniel LaRusso in Cobra Kai, an action comedy-drama series that began on YouTube Red and later moved to Netflix. Cobra Kai begins in the fall of 2017, and re-examines the "Miyagi-Verse" narrative from Johnny's point of view, beginning with his decision to reopen the Cobra Kai karate dojo, and the rekindling of his old rivalry with Daniel. Along with William Zabka, he is also a co-executive producer of the series.

Memoir
In 2022, Macchio published the memoir Waxing On: The Karate Kid and Me (Dutton), in which he reflects upon the legacy of the Karate Kid films and Cobra Kai.

Personal life
Macchio was introduced to his future wife, Phyllis Fierro, by his grandmother when he was 15. They married on April 5, 1987, and have two children, Julia (born 1992) and Daniel (born 1996). Fierro is a nurse practitioner.

Macchio is a fan of the New York Islanders hockey team and was featured as the team's celebrity captain in the 1991 Pro Set Platinum trading card series. A 2016 bobblehead promotion saw his likeness in the team's uniform donning the iconic 'crane kick' pose from The Karate Kid''.

Filmography

Film

Television

Theatre

Music videos

Video game

Book

References

External links
 
 
Ralph Macchio & Yuji Okumoto Present Best Fighting Game at The Game Awards 2020 – The Game Awards, December 2020.
Ralph Macchio of "Cobra Kai" on Memoir "Waxing On: The Karate Kid and Me"– The View, October 18, 2022. 

1961 births
20th-century American male actors
21st-century American male actors
American male film actors
American male television actors
American people of Italian descent
American people of Greek descent
Living people
Male actors from New York (state)
People from Huntington, New York
People of Neapolitan descent